"Durham Town (The Leavin')" is a song, written and sung by Roger Whittaker, released as a single in 1969.  It spent 18 weeks on the UK Singles Chart, peaking at No. 12. In 1976, the song reached No. 8 on Canada's RPM "Pop Music Playlist", while reaching No. 23 on Billboard's Easy Listening chart.

Whittaker's original intent, to set the song in Newcastle, had been abandoned in favour of nearby Durham because Whittaker agreed with his producer that "Durham" simply sounded better. While focusing the song on Newcastle, Whittaker had set its second verse "on the banks of the river Tyne", and as Whittaker had little or no familiarity with his chosen locale for the song he retained the verse with its Tyneside setting for the song's finalized version set in Durham. In fact the Tyne flows eastwards through Newcastle but it is the Wear, 20 miles to the south, which flows through Durham.

Under its original title "The Leaver", the song first appeared on Whittaker's 1969 album release This is...Roger Whittaker, recorded with producer Denis Preston at Preston's studio in Lansdowne House. When the track - renamed "Durham Town (The Leavin')" - was issued as a single in October 1969, Whittaker would recall: "I just didn't have any faith in that song at all. Far from promoting the single in Britain, I went off to Finland for a cabaret season and television appearances." Whittaker returned to Britain in November to find "Durham Town..." ascending the UK Singles chart towards a No. 12 peak in January 1970: on the Irish Singles Chart "Durham Town..." was afforded a chart peak of No. 17.

In Australia the single - titled "The Leavin' (Durham Town)" - attracted enough regional success to chart nationally at No. 80. "Durham Town (The Leavin')" was included on the US release of Whittaker's 1970 album New World in the Morning whose title cut was coupled with "Durham Town..." to form Whittaker's first US single. Whittaker recorded a French rendering of "Durham Town..." entitled "Mon Pays Bleu (Durham Town)" which was issued in France and also in Canada. The wake of the success Whittaker enjoyed with "The Last Farewell" in the summer of 1975 caused the re-release of "Durham Town..." in the US and Canada, where the track became an Easy Listening hit. "Durham Town..." was also included on the 1975 Whittaker album The Last Farewell & Other Hits.

The song has also been recorded by Anne and Laura Brand (album The Pride O' The North/ 1970), Val Doonican (as "Leaving (Durham Town)"/album Just A Sittin' And A Rockin'/ 1971), and Finnish singer Robin as "Jäähyväiset" (1970).

Chart performance

References

1969 songs
1969 singles
Roger Whittaker songs
Columbia Records singles
Songs about England